Duskam (also Romanized as Duskām; also known as Voskām, Dorostakān, Dostgan, Dūstegān, and Dūstekān) is a village in Barakuh Rural District, Jolgeh-e Mazhan District, Khusf County, South Khorasan Province, Iran. At the 2006 census, its population was 15, in 7 families.

References 

Populated places in Khusf County